The 1912 Nebraska gubernatorial election was held on November 5, 1912.

Incumbent Republican Governor Chester Hardy Aldrich was defeated for re-election by Democratic nominee John H. Morehead.

Primary elections
Primary elections were held on April 19, 1912.

Democratic primary

Candidates
Richard Lee Metcalfe, newspaper editor
John H. Morehead, President pro tempore of the State Senate

Withdrew
Charles W. Pool

Results

People's Independent primary

Candidates
Richard Lee Metcalfe, newspaper editor
John H. Morehead, President pro tempore of the State Senate

Results

Metcalfe withdrew in favour of Morehead.

Prohibition primary

Candidates
Nathan Wilson

Results

Republican primary

Candidates
Chester Hardy Aldrich, incumbent Governor
Jesse S. Newton, merchant

Results

Socialist primary

Candidates
Clyde J. Wright, Socialist candidate for Governor in 1910

Results

General election

Candidates
Major party candidates
John H. Morehead, Democratic and People's Independent
Chester Hardy Aldrich, Republican and Progressive

Other candidates
Nathan Wilson, Prohibition
Clyde J. Wright, Socialist

Results

References

Bibliography
 

1912
Nebraska
Gubernatorial